Olaf Dalsgaard-Olsen (born 1903) was a Danish film producer who was nominated for the Academy Award for Best Foreign Language Film in 1956 for his film Qivitoq.

External links 
 The Official Academy Awards Database. Academy of Motion Picture Arts and Sciences. Last accessed on November 14, 2007.

Danish film producers
Place of birth missing
1903 births
Year of death missing
Place of death missing